Moita is a municipality in the district of Setúbal in Portugal. The population in 2011 was 66,029, in an area of 55.26 km2.

The municipality is part of the Greater Lisbon Area, with a demographic rate of 1.194,9/km2 in 2011, growing from 533,2/km2 in 1960. As part of Lisbon's suburban area, the population is mostly working age and senior individuals. The aging indicator (1 senior per 100 youngsters) is 106,9.

The present Mayor is Rui Garcia, elected by the Democratic Unity Coalition. The municipal holiday is the 1st Tuesday after the 2nd Sunday of September.

Parishes
Administratively, the municipality is divided into 4 civil parishes (freguesias):
 Alhos Vedros
 Baixa da Banheira e Vale da Amoreira
 Moita
 Gaio-Rosário e Sarilhos Pequenos

Notable people 
 Ana de Mendonça (1460-1542) was a maid of Joanna la Beltraneja and mistress of King John II of Portugal 
 Carolina Santos (born in 1986) a Portuguese legal adviser, model and TV actress

Sport 
 Manuel Fernandes (born 1951) a football manager and former player with 485 club caps and 31 for Portugal
 Carlos Manuel (born 1958) a Portuguese retired footballer with 371 club caps and 43 for Portugal
 Diamantino Miranda (born 1959) a football manager and former player with 344 club caps and 22 for Portugal

References

External links
Town Hall official website

 
Towns in Portugal
Populated places in Setúbal District
Municipalities of Setúbal District